Jesse Pearson may refer to:

Jesse Pearson (actor) (1930-1979)
Jesse Pearson (writer) who was the editor-in-chief of Vice Magazine (2002 until 2010)

See also
Pearson (surname)